Universal Television LLC (abbreviated as UTV) is an American television production company that is a subsidiary of Universal Studio Group, a division of Comcast's NBCUniversal. It serves as the network television production arm of NBC; a predecessor of the company previously assumed such functions, and a substantial portion of the company's shows air on the network. It was formerly known by various names, including Revue Studios, Universal Pictures Television Department, Universal-International Television, Studios USA Television LLC, Universal Studios Network Programming, Universal Network Television, Universal Domestic Television, NBC Universal Television Studio, and Universal Media Studios. Re-established in 2004, both NBC Studios and the original Universal Television are predecessors of the current Universal Television, formerly known as NBC Universal Television Studio and Universal Media Studios.

Universal Television Alternative Studio
Universal Television Alternative Studio ("Universal Television Alternative" according to the company's on-screen logo) is a television production company owned by Universal Television made in 2016. The unit reports to the president of alternative and reality group, NBC Entertainment Meredith Ahr.

The studio was formed in June 2016 under president Meredith Ahr. In July 2016, the studio's first program, World of Dance was announced by NBC. The studio sold its first show to another channel In Search Of... to History.

The studio, as did Universal TV, signed a first-look agreement with Chelsea Handler in March 2018. Both production units signed that same year in August an overall agreement with Eddie Schmidt.

In November 2018, Ahr became president of alternative and reality group, NBC Entertainment. Ahr was replaced as the studio's president in August 2019 by Toby Gorman, last the interim CEO of Magical Elves. From Endemol Shine North America, Georgie Hurford-Jones was hired in December 2019 as executive vice president of current programming.

Mario Lopez moved from hosting Extra to NBCUniversal's Access Hollywood in July 2019 with production deal with Universal TV and Universal TV Alternative Studio. His first project, Menudo an hour-long competition show, under the deal was announced to be in development in April 2020.

Background

Revue Studios
Revue Productions (later known as Revue Studios) was founded in 1943 by MCA Inc. to produce live radio shows and also produced "Stage Door Canteen" live events for the United Service Organizations (USO) during World War II. Revue was re-launched as MCA's television production subsidiary in 1950. The partnership of NBC and Revue extends as far back as September 6, 1950, with the television broadcast of Armour Theatre, based on radio's Stars Over Hollywood. MCA bought the Universal Studios backlot in 1958 and renamed it Revue Studios. Following its merger with Decca Records, the then-parent of Universal Pictures, the studio backlot name was changed back to Universal. In 1963, MCA formed Universal City Studios to merge the motion picture and television arms of both Universal Pictures and Revue Studios and Revue was officially renamed Universal Television in 1963.

During the early years of television, Revue was responsible for producing and/or distributing many television programs. These included Leave It to Beaver, which ran for only one season on CBS before going to ABC from 1958 until 1963. In addition, Revue also made Alan Hale Jr.'s Biff Baker, U.S.A. (1952–1953) and all three of Rod Cameron's syndicated series, City Detective (1953–1955), State Trooper (1956–1959), and Coronado 9 (1960–1961) and the Bill Williams western series, The Adventures of Kit Carson (1951–1955). It produced Bachelor Father (1957–1962), for "Bachelor Productions", Edmond O'Brien's syndicated crime film Johnny Midnight, based on a fictitious New York City actor-turned-private investigator. Another of its offerings was the 52-episode Crusader, the first Brian Keith series, which ran on CBS 1955–1956. Another western produced by Revue and starring Audie Murphy was Whispering Smith (NBC, 1959/61), based on the 1948 Alan Ladd movie of the same name. Leave It to Beaver was produced first by George Gobel's Gomalco Productions, then by Kayro Productions on a back lot at Revue Studios from 1958 to 1963. Also McHale's Navy was produced by Revue from 1962 to 1966.

In December 1958, MCA/Revue purchased Universal Studios' 367-acre backlot to produce television series, then leased it back to Universal for a million dollars a year for a decade.

Revue produced later seasons of The Jack Benny Program for CBS and NBC and in co-operation with Jack Benny's J and M productions Checkmate, General Electric Theater and Alfred Hitchcock Presents for CBS, Studio 57 for DuMont Television Network, and westerns such as Tales of Wells Fargo, The Restless Gun and Laramie for NBC, as well as Wagon Train for NBC and ABC, and the first two seasons of NBC's The Virginian, based on a film released originally by Paramount Pictures, whose pre-1950 theatrical sound feature film library was sold to MCA in 1957. Wagon Train was the only Revue-produced TV show ever to finish an American television season in first place.

NBC Studios (production company)
NBC Television Network was founded in 1947 by RCA (NBC's former parent company). In 1955, NBC acquired production company Kagran Corporation, and by 1956, changed its company name to California National Productions. The company also brought several NBC-aired programs, like The Adventures of Hiram Holliday and The Lawless Years, as well as non-NBC programs like The Silent Service and Philip Marlowe, but none of them were successful. The company's first hit was the television show Bonanza, which lasted from 1959 to 1973 on the NBC television network. Its follow-up project that was produced independently was Outlaws, a western from 1960 to 1962. The third independently produced NBC show, The Americans, which aired only in 1961, lasted a few episodes, and bombed after only one season.

In 1961, California National changes its name to NBC Films, and in 1963, launched NBC Productions to continue producing its existing show Bonanza, and develop newer projects for the network. NBC developed and produced several shows internally like Kentucky Jones, Captain Nice and T.H.E. Cat. By 1966, the company had output talent deals with Sheldon Leonard, Bob Finkel, Norman Felton and David Dortort. The next big project was The High Chaparral, which was a hit among viewers throughout its four-season run, only to be axed in 1971 due to the rural purge. Throughout its partnership with Sheldon Leonard, they produced three shows Accidental Family, My Friend Tony and My World and Welcome to It, but none of them were successful. By 1974, NBC is producing the next big hit Little House on the Prairie.

By the 1980s, NBC is producing Punky Brewster, which was popular among viewers. NBC's production output was primarily on television movies and miniseries. NBC's other television series output were Sara and Roomies, both of them were unsuccessful. In 1985, Michael Filerman through his Michael Filerman Productions company signed a deal with NBC Productions to develop long-form telemovies and miniseries, as well as television series. In the late 1980s, NBC Productions attempted to get into the film business, but it was proven unsuccessful, after the failure of the film Codename: Emerald. In 1987, NBC Productions provided funding for a feature film that starred Cassandra Peterson as her Elvira character, which raised $5–6 million by NBC to fund the film. In 1988, NBC started a deal with Peter Engel that resulted in the creation of Good Morning, Miss Bliss and eventually producing a number of teen shows.

In early 1990, NBC had struck a development deal with musician/producer Quincy Jones and his Quincy Jones Entertainment company. Also the same year, NBC signed a deal with Jay Tarses for his production company. By 1990, NBC returned to producing hit programs with the sitcom The Fresh Prince of Bel Air, which starred Will Smith, in one of the first TV roles. Also that same year, NBC Productions partnered with Group W Productions to develop a syndicated program House Party. In 1991, NBC produced another syndicated show, this time, out of the WMAQ-TV studios, Johnny B...On the Loose, in partnership with Viacom Enterprises.

In 1993, Perry Simon left NBC to start his own production company with a non-exclusive production agreement. In 1995, NBC launched a partnership with television director James Burrows to create 3 Sisters Entertainment, who produced series for the network. Out of these five, the most successful out of the venture were Will & Grace and Caroline in the City (co-produced and owned by CBS Productions). Later that year, NBC Productions was however folded into NBC's entertainment division.

In 1996, the company was renamed NBC Studios. The company had returned to producing hit programs like The Pretender, Profiler, Providence, Ed, Las Vegas and Crossing Jordan. In 2004, NBC Studios was merged with Universal Network Television to form NBC Universal Television Studio.

Universal Television (original iteration)
The first incarnation of Universal Television was reincorporated from Revue Productions in 1964, 2 years after MCA Inc. bought Universal Pictures and its then-current parent Decca Records. Among their many contributions to television programming included production of the first television film (See How They Run from 1964), the first wheel series (The Name of the Game from 1968), the first rotating series with an umbrella title (1969's The Bold Ones) and the first two-part television movie (Vanished from 1971). Uni TV (also commonly known as MCA/Universal) also co-produced many shows with Jack Webb's Mark VII Limited such as Emergency!, Adam-12 and a revival of the 1951 series Dragnet. During the 1970s and 1980s, Uni TV produced shows such as Baretta, The Rockford Files, Murder, She Wrote, Miami Vice, The Equalizer, The Incredible Hulk, Battlestar Galactica, Buck Rogers in the 25th Century, Knight Rider, The A-Team, Simon & Simon and Magnum, P.I., which received critical acclaim and several TV movie spin-offs after their cancellations.

In 1967, Grant Tinker, formerly employee of NBC was hired to join the studio. He held the position for two years, until he left in 1969 to join 20th Century-Fox Television, and later that year, had to start MTM Enterprises. He subsequently left Fox in 1971 due to conflicts with running MTM.

In 1980, Bud Austin has received a production contract with Universal Television to produce television series. One of the more notable and legendary contracts was writer/producer Dick Wolf, whose Universal association began in 1986 with Miami Vice, then writing for several more shows before creating the hit Law & Order franchise. In 1987, Universal Television, which by then, was the leading producers in prime time television programming, decided to have six pilots committed for network production value, plus three series for the 1987–88 season, which included development deals with people who already contracted with Universal.

In 1990, MCA/Uni TV began the Law & Order franchise. In 1991, Tom Thayer was named president of the Universal Television arm. In 1993, former Warner Bros. Television senior vice president of production employee Steven J. Papazian joined Universal Television as vice president of production. In 1992, Universal Television signed a deal with several newer talent, plus some returning and existing talent that were offered at the studio, including Ivan Reitman, David Burke, John Leekley and R.J. Stewart. In 1993, St. Clare Entertainment, a company owned by John Landis had reupped its contract at both MCA TV, MTE and Universal Television, three of the encompassing TV units of MCA via the MCA TV Group. In 1994, Universal Television made a financing partnership with ABC to help them fund the show Blue Skies.

In 1996, MCA was reincorporated as Universal Studios. Around the same time, Universal was acquired by Joseph A. Seagram and Sons and later acquired the Multimedia Entertainment and USA Network. Also that year, Universal Television collaborated with Warner Bros. Television to develop the series Spy Game for ABC, with Universal alumnus Sam Raimi and Robert Tapert of Renaissance Pictures, and Warner alumnus John McNamara producing the series, but it didn't last long, as it only lasted one season on the air.

Universal purchased a 50% stake of Brillstein-Grey Entertainment in 1996 for $75 to $100 million. They considered buying the other 50% after selling its own TV unit to Barry Diller in 1998. Universal sold its stake in BGE in 1999 and BGE was renamed as Brad Grey Television, though Universal continued to co-produce Just Shoot Me! and The Steve Harvey Show until their cancellations.

EMKA, Ltd. is the holding company responsible for a majority of the pre-1950 Paramount Pictures sound library. As an official part of the Universal Pictures library, they are part of the company's television unit, Universal Television.

MCA Television Entertainment
For the 1970s and 1980s, MCA TV, the syndication company, had a production shop that produced shows like Probe, which was for air on ABC.

MTE (known as MCA Television Entertainment) was formed in 1989 as a telemovie and cable division of Universal Television. It primarily dealt with made-for-TV movies and series like Dream On that were made for cable networks like HBO. It was also a producer of first-run syndication programming for the Hollywood Premiere Network, which was distributed by MCA's own syndication arm MCA TV, as well as KCOP-TV in Los Angeles and WWOR-TV in New York, such as They Came from Outer Space, Shades of L.A. and She-Wolf of London, but it only lasted one season from 1990 to 1991, but it didn't last long.

In 1990, Michael Landsbury was named vice president of series programs, Angela Mancuso as vice president of production, and Michael Houbrick was named assistant director of publicity, at the studio.

One of the most notable clients of MTE was Papazian-Hirsch Entertainment, who produced a bulk of these television movies and series for the studio.

In 1996, it was renamed as Universal Television Entertainment (or UTE for short) to align with MCA's rebranding as Universal Studios. It was eventually renamed to Studios USA Pictures in 1998. MCA Television Entertainment is also a collective branding for their units owned and operated by MCA, and it absorbed Universal Family Entertainment and Universal Cartoon Studios in 1996.

Studios USA Television
USA Networks Inc. was formed by Barry Diller when he bought Universal's major television assets in October 1997. Among its assets were the USA Network and Sci-Fi Network cable channels along with series such as Law & Order. Additionally, the company would own the HSN, the Ticketmaster Group and several TV stations. Universal TV's production and distribution unit was renamed Studios USA. Universal held on to its 50% share of Brillstein-Grey Entertainment, PolyGram's international channels and the rights to its TV library while signing a long-term domestic sales deal with Studios USA for the library. Universal got a 45% share in USA Networks Inc. Greg Meidel initially resigned and was rehired as chairman and CEO of Studios USA, only to leave in June 1998.

In 1999, USA Networks formed its own film and home media divisions when they acquired October Films and several production and distribution assets of PolyGram Filmed Entertainment for $200 million. Most of the new shows produced under the Studios USA name bombed after only one or two seasons; only Law & Order: Special Victims Unit, Law & Order: Criminal Intent and The District were deemed to be big hits. Although the latter two were cancelled, in 2011 and 2004 respectively, the former is still an ongoing show.

In 2000, Clyde Phillips has signed an overall deal with the studio to develop scripts made for the studio.

In 2001, Vivendi acquired USA's entertainment assets for an estimated $10.3 billion. Under the deal, Barry Diller became chairman of Vivendi Universal Entertainment. USA Networks is currently known as IAC. Shortly afterwards, in 2002, it was merged with Universal Studios Network Television, producers of NBC's sitcom Just Shoot Me! to form Universal Network Television.

PolyGram Television/Universal Network Television
In 1997, PolyGram created not only its syndication unit, but a network unit for long-form television movies and drama series, which was a rebranding from the former UK-based ITC Entertainment television division of PolyGram. It was headed up by Bob Sanitsky, who headed the combined syndication and network divisions. In 1998, it signed a deal with Meg Ryan and her Prufock Pictures to set up her projects at the studio.

In early 1999, Shortly after Seagram and Universal completed their deal to acquire PolyGram. PolyGram TV was absorbed into Universal's TV and Networks division (which consisted of Universal's international TV operations). Universal would sell the ITC film and TV library to Carlton Communications, and the pre-1996 film library to Metro-Goldwyn-Mayer. Shortly afterwards, PolyGram Television was then retained by Universal, opting Bob Sanitsky out of the unit. Universal however then launched Universal Studios Network Programming to inherit the Brillstein-Grey productions, such as the upcoming Work with Me, and the existing Brillstein-Grey shows Just Shoot Me! and The Steve Harvey Show. In 2001, NBC had an option agreement with Universal Network Television to keep Just Shoot Me! on the air to 2003.

In June 2002, Universal Studios Network Television was also merged with Studios USA Network Television around the same time. In 2003, writer John Ridley signed a deal with the studio. Also that year, longtime Universal executives Sarah Timberman and Carl Beverly left the studio to start out 25C Productions, a production company affiliated with Warner Bros. Television.

USA Cable Entertainment
The origins of USA Cable Entertainment was traced back to the 1980s when it was formed as USA Network Productions to produce content for the USA Networks. In 1996, it was rebranded to USA Studios, and in 1999 to USA Networks Productions, and later on reincorporated as USA Cable Entertainment on December 24, 1999. Stephen Chao is the company's president since 2000.

The company is best known for producing Monk and the 2003 miniseries Battlestar Galactica, which spawned a reboot in 2004.

History
NBC Universal Television Studios was formed in 2004 from NBC Studios and Universal Network Television after NBC and Universal merged. On June 14, 2007, NBC Universal Television Studio was renamed Universal Media Studios (UMS) as the unit would be also developing entertainment for the web.

On July 21, 2009, Universal Cable Productions was split off from UMS and placed into NBCUniversal Cable Entertainment Group division. On September 14, 2011, Universal Media Studios was renamed to Universal Television. In October 2019, Universal Television was transferred from NBC Entertainment to NBCUniversal Content Studios.

Shows produced

References

External links

 
National Broadcasting Company
NBCUniversal
Television syndication distributors
Television production companies of the United States
Mass media companies based in New York City
Mass media companies established in 1943
Mass media companies established in 1951
Mass media companies established in 2004
1943 establishments in New York (state)
1951 establishments in New York (state)
2004 establishments in New York (state)
Peabody Award winners
American companies established in 1943
American companies established in 1951
American companies established in 2004